Kadri Sancak (born 1 September 1966) is a retired Turkish football defender.

References

1966 births
Living people
Turkish footballers
Zeytinburnuspor footballers
Denizlispor footballers
Gaziantepspor footballers
Vanspor footballers
Altay S.K. footballers
Aydınspor footballers
Siirtspor footballers
Beykozspor footballers
Association football defenders
Süper Lig players